Villa-Lobos is a crater on Mercury. Its name was adopted by the International Astronomical Union (IAU) on September 25, 2015. Villa-Lobos is named for the Brazilian composer Heitor Villa-Lobos.

The scarp called Grifo Rupes cuts across Villa-Lobos north to south.

References

Impact craters on Mercury